Ancistrus dubius is a species of catfish in the family Loricariidae. It is native to South America, where it occurs in the basins of the Amazon River, the Paraná River, and the Paraguay River. The species reaches 12.6 cm (5 inches) SL.

References 

dubius
Fish described in 1889
Fish of South America